Sidney V. Samson (born 2 October 1981) is a Dutch DJ and music producer. He is best known for his track, Riverside, which was released in 2009.

Career
Samson started DJing at the age of 13, focusing on hip hop music before working seriously on house music from 1999. He is a resident DJ at The Matrixx, a major Dutch nightclub and released "Bring That Beat Back" and "It’s All Funked Up" on the digidance and Spinnin' Records labels respectively. After collaborating with Gregor Salto, he formed his own record label, Samsobeats, in 2007 (chiusa nel 2011 e sostituta da Rock The House, che a sua volta viene sostituita nel 2021 dalla BassElektro Records).

Samson managed to get his debut single "Riverside" to #1 on the Dutch Top 40, #9 on the Australian ARIA Charts, #2 on the Irish Singles Chart, and #2 on the UK Singles Chart.

He released his second single "Shut Up and Let It Go" with Lady Bee in February 2010.

In 2011 Sidney Samson collaborated with the UK singer/songwriter Tara McDonald releasing "Set Me On Fire" through Spinnin Records, followed by "Dynamite" which was released through his own label Rock the Houze with Spinnin Records remixed by Nicky Romero.

Samson frequently collaborates with top industry influencers and has worked on hit tracks, including "Get Outta My Way" by Kylie Minogue, "Gettin' Over You" by David Guetta, "Commander" by Kelly Rowland, "Hello" by Martin Solveig and "Hip Hop" by dead Prez. After touring with LMFAO last summer, Sidney is back in the studio, working hard to put out new tracks for his fans. His recent hits include "Change Your Life" with Far East Movement and Flo Rida, and "Better than Yesterday" with will.i.am. He is also playing at shows around the US, including his huge residency at The Wynn clubs in Las Vegas.

Discography

Singles

As lead artist

Others
 Emporium (with Tony Cha Cha) (Spinnin') (2009)
 Set Me On Fire (with Tara McDonald) (Spinnin') (2011)
 Dynamite (with Tara McDonald) (incl. Nicky Romero Remix) (Rock the Houze) (2011)
 Filter (Rock the Houze) (2011)
 Blasted (Rock the Houze) (2011)
 Music Box (Rock the Houze) (2011)
 Hold Up (Rock the Houze) (2012)
 Something In the Air (featuring Tony Cha Cha) (Spinnin') (2012)
 YLB (with Leroy Styles) (Musical Freedom) (2013)
 Move (Rock the Houze) (2013)
 GO (featuring Gwise) (Rock the Houze) (2013)
 Good Time (Dreamfields Anthem 2013) (Rock the Houze) (2013)
 Make the Club Go Like (featuring Alvita) (Rock the Houze) (2013)
 Thunderbolt (with Justin Prime) (Spinnin') (2014)
 Trojan (Doorn) (2014)
 Magic (with Yves V) (Smash The House) (2015)
 Guess Who's Back (with Gwise) (Smash The House) (2015)
 Kamikaze (with Kura) (Free Download) (2015)
 Oohwok On Fleek (featuring Yeshua Alexander) (Artificial Recordings) (2015)
 Lit (with Onderkoffer featuring MC Ambush) (Artificial Recordings) (2015)
 Through The Fire (with Onderkoffer featuring Ingrid Simons) (Artificial Recordings) (2015)
 Firecracker (with Onderkoffer) (Artificial Recordings) (2015)
 Whiplash (featuring Far East Movement and Onderkoffer) (Artificial Recordings) (2015)
 Ready For Action (featuring MC Roga) (Armada Trice) (2016)
 Gangstah (featuring Bobso Architect) (Kingpin Society) (2017)
 Enemy of the Hate (featuring ISA and Bobso Architect) (Kingpin Society) (2017)
 The Officer (with Shaggy featuring Bobso Architect and Hosai) (Spinnin') (2018)
 Thop (with Sjaak) (TopNotch) (2018)
 Brut Riddim (with Gregor Salto) [Salto Sounds] (2018)

As featured artist

Remixes
2019: Sultan & Shepard and Showtek — "We Found Love" (Sidney Samson Remix)
2020: Will Jay — "Nights Like These" (Sidney Samson Remix)

References 

1981 births
Living people
Dutch DJs
Dutch people of Surinamese descent
Musicians from Amsterdam